Samare was an outer garment of ladies in the 17th century. It was a loose jacket with extra frills hung down to the knees in the style of a gown. It was worn with a petticoat.

As per Randle Holme, it was a long-skirted jacket with four separate tails falling to knee-length.

References 

Skirts
History of clothing
History of clothing (Western fashion)
17th-century fashion